Seth A. Darst is a Jack Fishman Professor of molecular biophysics at the Rockefeller University. He was elected to the United States National Academy of Sciences in 2008.

Life and career
Darst earned his B.S. in chemical engineering from the University of Colorado at Boulder in 1982. He continued his education with advisor Channing R. Robertson at Stanford University, where he earned both M.S. (1984) and Ph.D. (1987) degrees in chemical engineering. Darst completed postdoctoral training, also at Stanford, as an American Cancer Society Postdoctoral Fellow and a Lucille P. Markley Postdoctoral Scholar in the laboratory of Roger D. Kornberg. He joined the faculty at the Rockefeller University in 1992. Darst's research centers on the structural basis of transcription by exploring the enzymes involved in the process.

Honors and awards
2008 – Elected to the United States National Academy of Sciences
1995 – Pew Scholar in the Biomedical Sciences
1994 – Irma T. Hirschl Charitable Trust Career Scientist

References

External links
 Microbe World audio interview with Dr. Seth Darst

Living people
Members of the United States National Academy of Sciences
21st-century American chemists
Rockefeller University faculty
University of Colorado Boulder alumni
Stanford University alumni
Year of birth missing (living people)
Fellows of the American Academy of Microbiology